Lê Đức Anh (1 December 1920 – 22 April 2019) was a Vietnamese politician and general who served as the fifth President of Vietnam from 1992 to 1997. He previously led the Vietnamese forces in Cambodia throughout the 1980s. He was regarded as a conservative who advocated maintaining tight party control over domestic policies.

Early life and military career
Lê Đức Anh was born in Phú Lộc District in Thừa Thiên–Huế Province. In August 1945, he joined the army. From October 1948 to 1950, he was chief of staff of the 7th Military Region, 8th Military Region  and administrative region of Saigon–Cho Lon. From 1951 to 1954, served as  Deputy Chief of Staff, acting Chief of Staff of Cochinchina. From August 1963, he served as Deputy Chief of General Staff of the Vietnam People's Army. February 1964, to the South Vietnam, position of Deputy Commander and Chief of Staff of the People's Liberation Armed Force (Vietcong).

After his participation as a member of Việt Minh on the led by Ho Chi Minh August Revolution 1945, which led to the founding of the Democratic Republic of Vietnam (North Vietnam) on 2 September 1945, he began his military service in the North Vietnamese People's Army, the precursor of the Vietnamese People's Army ( Quân Đội Nhân Dân Việt Nam). First, he was a political officer in a battalion and then in the 301th Regiment. He was then first from October 1948 to 1950 Political Officer in the Military Region No. 7 (Đông Nam Bộ) with the seat in Saigon. In this function he took part between 1951 and 1954 in the Indochina War.

After the Indochina Conference in 1954 in Geneva, he was an officer in the General Staff of the People's Army and promoted there in 1958 to the colonel (Đại tá). Between 1964 and 1968 he was head of the Human Resources Department of the National Front for the Liberation of South Vietnam (Việt Cộng).

In 1969 he became commander of Military Region No. 9 in the Mekong Delta (đồng bằng sông Cửu Long). After his promotion to Lieutenant General (Trung tướng), he participated in the Vietnam War on the Ho Chi Minh campaign against South Vietnam from December 1974 to April 1975 as commander of the units in West Vietnam (Hướng Tāy Nam). In May 1976 he was then again commander of the Military Region No. 9, before he was commander and political commissar of the Military Region No. 7 in Ho Chi Minh City from June 1978 to 1981. As such, in 1980 he was promoted to Colonel-General (Thượng tướng).

As a general Anh was the commander of the Vietnamese forces in the People's Republic of Kampuchea in the 1980s. He formulated five key points for the defence of Cambodia against Khmer Rouge re-infiltration and was the architect of the K5 Plan.

Political career
Later he entered politics and he held a succession of government posts. During his time as Defence Minister General he was already a major conservative voice in Vietnam's political system. In 1989, after the collapse of communism in Eastern Europe, he warned about the alleged threat of the West undermining Vietnam's Communist Party, arguing for more army involvement in politics "at a time when Vietnamese socialism was under attack".

Between 1976 and 1997 Lê Đức Anh was also a member of the National Assembly (Quốc hội Việt Nam). From 1991 (to 1993) Anh controlled Vietnamese policy towards Cambodia and China and therefore was involved in the normalisation of Vietnam's relations with China in November 1991. He was the first Vietnamese president to visit Beijing in 38 years since an official visit in November 1993 to discuss economic relations and territorial disputes in the South China Sea; however, consensus was achieved only on the former issue.

In 1981 he was appointed Deputy Minister of Defense and Head of the Political Department in the Ministry of Defense (Bộ Quốc phòng). In the same year he was appointed commander of the Vietnamese army during the occupation of Cambodia and there in 1984 promoted to general.

Between 1982 and 2001 he was also a member of the Politburo of the Communist Party of Vietnam (Bộ Chính trị Ban Chấp hành Trung ương Đảng Cộng sản Việt Nam).

After his return, he was the successor of the late in office General Lê Trọng Tấn from December 1986 to February 1987 Chief of the General Staff of the Vietnamese People's Army (Tổng Tham mưu trưởng Quân đội Nhân dân Việt Nam). He then followed General Văn Tiến Dũng as Secretary of Defense and retained this position until his replacement by General Đoàn Khuê in 1992.

President
In September 1992, he was elected to the new post of state president, replacing a collective presidency. Although a mostly symbolic position, the presidency became much more important during his tenure. On September 23, 1992, he was the successor to Võ Chí Công Chairman of the State Council and thus President of Vietnam. This predominantly ceremonial office he held until his replacement by Trần Đức Lương on 24 September 1997.

For his services, General Lê Đức Anh received several awards, including the Order of the Golden Star (Huân chương Sao vàng) and the Ho Chi Minh Order (Huân chương Hồ Chí Minh).

Anh is considered by many to have been (ideologically) the most conservative (communist) among the three political leaders during his tenure. Prime Minister Võ Văn Kiệt was associated with the reform camp and therefore often disagreed with Anh. Secretary-General of the Communist Party of Vietnam Đỗ Mười was ideologically more flexible and effectively came to be seen as representing the middle ground between Anh and Kiệt, but seems to have tended towards conservative positions.

His opposition to Kiệt's reform ambitions are part of a long-lasting rivalry. In 1991, Anh joined Đỗ Mười to support him in his candidacy for party leadership against Võ Văn Kiệt. The Kiệt camp later spread rumours about wrongdoings Anh was said to be involved in Cambodia.

Resignation
In mid-November 1996, he was hospitalized after a major stroke. This was at a time when the reform camp that he opposed was in decline and for some time his illness seemed to change the dynamics within the political leadership, weakening the conservative camp and reinvigorating the reform camp. However, Party leader Đỗ Mười led a counter-attack against the reform camp, warning of the dangers of the 'current market economy'. The conservative camp gained further momentum when Anh surprisingly recovered in April 1997. He stepped down as president in September 1997 after the  Communist Party Congress, was replaced by Trần Đức Lương. He was an Advisor of the Party's Central Committee from December 1997 – 2001.

Personal life
In 1951, Anh married his first wife, Phạm Thị Anh (1925–2011). and had two daughters. In 1956, Anh married his second wife, Võ Thị Lê (1928 – 18 November 2016). and had one son and one daughter.

On 21 February 2018, he suffered a cerebral hemorrhage and was admitted to the Central Military Hospital 108 in Hanoi in critical condition. He was discharged in June and resumed public life, however he was readmitted in July. Lê Đức Anh died on 22 April 2019 at the age of 98. He was given a state funeral on 3–4 May 2019.

Death and road to funeral 
On 22 April 2019, Lê Đức Anh died, aged 98, at 8:10 PM, local time, at house number 5A Hoàng Diệu in Hanoi. He was given a state funeral on 3–4 May, and his body lay in state at the national morgue in Hanoi until his burial in his home province of Ho Chi Minh City.

See also
K5 Plan

References

Sources
 Bolton, Kent (1999): "Domestic Sources of Vietnam's Foreign Policy: Normalizing Relations with the United States". in Thayer, Carlyle A., Amer, Ramses (ed.): Vietnamese Foreign Policy in Transition. Institute of Southeast Asian Studies, Singapore
 Thayer, Carlyle A. (1999): "Vietnamese Foreign Policy: Multilateralism and the Threat of Peaceful Evolution". in Thayer, Carlyle A., Amer, Ramses (1999): Vietnamese Foreign Policy in Transition. Institute of Southeast Asian Studies, Singapore
 Wurfel, David (1999): "Between China and ASEAN: The Dialectics of Recent Vietnamese Foreign Policy". in Thayer, Carlyle A., Amer, Ramses (ed.): Vietnamese Foreign Policy in Transition. Institute of Southeast Asian Studies, Singapore

1920 births
2019 deaths
People from Thừa Thiên-Huế province
Presidents of Vietnam
Vietnamese people of the Vietnam War
People's Republic of Kampuchea
Members of the 5th Politburo of the Communist Party of Vietnam
Members of the 6th Politburo of the Communist Party of Vietnam
Members of the 7th Politburo of the Communist Party of Vietnam
Members of the 8th Politburo of the Communist Party of Vietnam
Members of the Standing Committee of the 8th Politburo of the Communist Party of Vietnam
Members of the 7th Secretariat of the Communist Party of Vietnam
Members of the 4th Central Committee of the Communist Party of Vietnam
Members of the 5th Central Committee of the Communist Party of Vietnam
Members of the 6th Central Committee of the Communist Party of Vietnam
Members of the 7th Central Committee of the Communist Party of Vietnam
Members of the 8th Central Committee of the Communist Party of Vietnam
Ministers of Defence of Vietnam
Deaths from cerebrovascular disease